The 2010 Georgian local elections, were held on 30 May 2010, to elect the councils of local government, sakrebulo, and the Mayor of Tbilisi, the capital of Georgia. Direct elections for Tbilisi mayor were held for the first time, with the United National Movement receiving 86.4% of the seats nationwide.

Background
In spring 2009, various opposition parties initiated anti-government protests, demanding Mikheil Saakashvili's resignation. During the rallies, Tbilisi Mayor Gigi Ugulava proposed that local elections be held in spring 2010, before the statutory deadline of fall 2010, and that the Tbilisi mayor be directly elected by voters. Ugulava's initiative was approved by the President of Georgia, who addressed the UN General Assembly on 25 September 2009 and expressed his readiness for direct elections of all mayors in 2010. Nevertheless, on 28 December 2009, the Parliament of Georgia approved legislative changes that only established direct mayoral elections in Tbilisi. It was also determined that the mayor of Tbilisi would be elected with a 30% threshold.

2010 Tbilisi mayoral election 

The 2010 Tbilisi mayoral election was held on 30 May 2010. The main candidates in this election were Gigi Ugulava, incumbent mayor of Tbilisi, Irakli Alasania, Georgia's former Ambassador to the United Nations, Gia Chanturia, member of the Christian-Democratic Movement, Zviad Dzidziguri, veteran politician and the leader of the National Council, and Gogi Topadze, leader of the Industrialists.

Ugulava received 55.23% of the vote, thus passing the 30% threshold required to win in the first round of the election.

Results

 denotes a self-governing city.

Reactions
The elections were, for the most part, positively assessed by observer organizations

References

2010 in Georgia (country)
Local elections in Georgia (country)
May 2010 events in Europe
2010 elections in Europe